Miloš Prica was the Permanent Representative of Bosnia and Herzegovina to the United Nations from 2005 until 2012.

He presented his credentials to the Secretary-General of the United Nations on 8 September 2005, replacing Mirza Kušljugić.

Notes

Living people
Bosnia and Herzegovina diplomats
Permanent Representatives of Bosnia and Herzegovina to the United Nations
Year of birth missing (living people)
Place of birth missing (living people)